Ellen Kitch Childs (April 11, 1937 – January 10, 1993) was an American clinical psychologist and a lesbian activist known for her participation in the women's liberation movement in North America and for advocating for minority women, prostitutes, gays and lesbians. She was a founding member of the University of Chicago's Gay Liberation  and the first African American woman to earn her doctorate degree in Human Development at the University of Chicago.

Education 
Childs attended the University of Pittsburgh, and she graduated with a Bachelor of Science in Chemistry. She was so brilliant academically that she accomplished this during her early teen years. Later, Childs would attend the University of Chicago and received her Master of Science in Human Development in 1972. She was one of the first African-American women to earn a doctorate from the University of Chicago, also in human development.

Career 
After her graduation, Childs joined the United States Navy. In 1973, she started her first private practice in Oakland, California where she worked as a clinical psychologist for 17 years before bringing her work to Amsterdam in 1990, where she passed in 1993. Ellen Childs was a pioneer in the field of psychology, being one of the first therapists to hold therapy sessions in her house and in her clients’ houses. With this approach and others, Childs aimed to support black women and, furthermore, gay black women by "creating a treatment model where her clients would feel included".

Association for Women in Psychology 
Childs was a founding member of the Association for Women in Psychology (AWP). Childs as well as her two cofounders, Phyllis Chesler and Dorothy Riddle, formed the AWP in order to address the lack of organized research into the psychology of women. Initially the AWP was a group of female psychologists and activists who advocated within the American Psychological Association (APA) in order to address the grievances of female clients, psychologists, and councilors. Childs utilized this platform to advocate for marginalized women, namely black women and lesbians. In addition, she called for the APA to influence changes in the way these groups area treated in the fields of banking, medicine, legal issues, and education systems. She recognized that access to quality psychological services was disproportionately available to these marginalized groups. The practices upheld by the APA marginalized these women and promoted treatment options which were inherently sexist and not supported by the ongoing research into the psychology of women. By 1973 the AWP had accomplished enough credited research into the psychology of women that it became recognized as "Division 35" of the APA.

Activism 
Childs was a lesbian, and an activist in queer, women’s and Black spaces. She advocated for the decriminalization of prostitution through her involvement in the sex worker's rights group COYOTE (Call Off Your Old Tired Ethics) and anti-racist social movements. She was a founding member of the University of Chicago's Chicago Lesbian Liberation along with Vernita Gray and Michal Brody. At the time, the organization was named Women's Caucus of Chicago Gay Liberation. The organization helped organize the first pride in Chicago in 1970.  She provided therapy for LGBT individuals, particularly those with AIDS.

Childs was inducted into the Chicago LGBT Hall of Fame in 1993. This honor was given in recognition of her efforts to dismantle the American Psychiatric Association's position on homosexuality, which was listed as a psychological disorder in the Diagnostic and Statistical Manual of Mental Disorders until 1973.

Representative publications 
 Childs, E. K. (1966). Careers in the Military Service: A Review of the Literature. National Opinion Research Center, University of Chicago. 
Childs, E. K. (1972). Prediction of Outcome in Encounter Groups: Outcome as a Function of Selected Personality Correlates (Doctoral dissertation, University of Chicago, Committee on Human Development). 
Childs, E. K. (1976). An Annotated Bibliography on Prison Health Care. Prisoners' Health Project, San Francisco General Hospital Medical Center. 
Childs, E. K. (1990). Therapy, feminist ethics, and the community of color with particular emphasis on the treatment of Black women. In H. Lerman & N. Porter (Eds.), Feminist ethics in psychotherapy (p. 195–203). Springer Publishing Company.

References

External links 

Psychology's Feminist Voices exhibit

University of Chicago alumni
American lesbian writers
People from Chicago
American LGBT rights activists
American women's rights activists
1937 births
1993 deaths
20th-century American psychologists
African-American psychologists
American women psychologists
20th-century African-American women
20th-century African-American people
20th-century American people
20th-century American LGBT people
African-American women writers
Inductees of the Chicago LGBT Hall of Fame